Beta-D-glucopyranosyl abscisate beta-glucosidase (AtBG1, ABA-beta-D-glucosidase, ABA-specific beta-glucosidase, ABA-GE hydrolase, beta-D-glucopyranosyl abscisate hydrolase) is an enzyme with systematic name beta-D-glucopyranosyl abscisate glucohydrolase. This enzyme catalyses the following chemical reaction

 D-glucopyranosyl abscisate + H2O  D-glucose + abscisate

The enzyme hydrolyzes the biologically inactive beta-D-glucopyranosyl ester of abscisic acid to produce active abscisate.

References

External links 
 

EC 3.2.1